The Allison J71 was a single spool turbojet engine, designed and built in the United States. It began development in 1948 as a much modified J35, originally designated J35-A-23.

Operational history
The Allison J71 turbojet powered the Douglas B-66 Destroyer and the McDonnell F3H-2 Demon after the failed Westinghouse J40 proved unworkable. The prototype P6M SeaMasters were also fitted with the engine.

Variants
Data from: Aircraft engines of the World 1953
J71-A-1
J71-A-2 Powered the McDonnell F3H Demon
J71-A-2B 
J71-A-2E  thrust ( thrust with afterburner), for the McDonnell F3H-2 Demon.
YJ71-A-3  thrust ( thrust with afterburner)
J71-A-4Afterburning turbojet engines for the Martin XP6M-1 Seamaster flying boat prototypes.
J71-A-6Afterburning turbojet engines for the Martin YP6M-1 Seamaster pre-production flying boats.
J71-A-7  thrust with afterburner
J71-A-9 Powered the Douglas RB-66 Destroyer
J71-A-11  thrust
J71-A-13

Specifications (Allison J71-A-2)

See also

References

Further reading

External links
 
 

J71
1940s turbojet engines